Real Live Woman is the eighth studio album by American country music singer Trisha Yearwood, released on March 28, 2000.

The album reached #4 on the Billboard country albums chart. It produced a #16 hit on the Billboard country music charts in "Real Live Woman" and a #45 hit in "Where Are You Now". The latter was only the second single of Yearwood's career to miss Top 40 in the U.S.

The album covers a song by Bruce Springsteen called "Sad Eyes", a song by Linda Ronstadt titled, "Try Me Again", and a song by Bonnie Raitt called "Wild For You Baby". Emmylou Harris, Mary Chapin Carpenter, and Jackson Browne provide harmony vocals for some of the album's tracks. It was given 3 out of 5 stars by Allmusic.

Track listing

Australian bonus tracks
<li>"You're Where I Belong" (Diane Warren) - 4:15 (also available on the Japan pressing)
"Something So Right" (Paul Simon) - 4:11

Personnel 
 Trisha Yearwood – lead vocals, backing vocals (3, 9)
 Steve Cox – Hammond B3 organ (1-4, 8, 11), acoustic piano (8, 12), Wurlitzer electric piano (10)
 Steve Nathan – keyboards (4, 5), acoustic piano (6), Hammond B3 organ (6), harpsichord (11)
 Bobby Wood – acoustic piano (7)
 Kenny Vaughan – electric guitars (1-6, 8, 10), electric 12-string guitar (11)
 Richard Bennett – acoustic guitar (2, 10, 11, 12)
 Johnny Garcia – acoustic guitar (2, 3, 10, 11)
 Darrell Scott – bouzouki (1), acoustic guitar (3-6, 8)
 Al Anderson – acoustic guitar (9)
 Dan Dugmore – lap steel guitar (1, 2, 9, 10), acoustic guitar solo (2), steel guitar (3, 5, 6, 8), dobro (4), electric guitar (7, 11, 12), acoustic guitar (9), slide guitar (11)
 Mike Henderson – slide guitar (7)
 Sam Bush – mandolin (7)
 Keith Horne – bass (1-6, 8-12)
 Glenn Worf – bass (7)
 Greg Morrow – drums (1-6, 8, 10, 11, 12), maracas (1), tambourine (3, 4)
 Eddie Bayers – drums (7)
 Tom Roady – percussion (2, 7, 9, 10), triangle (5), tambourine (11)
 Stuart Duncan – fiddle (7, 8)
 David Campbell – string arrangements and conductor (7, 10, 12)
 Mary Chapin Carpenter – backing vocals (1)
 Kim Richey – backing vocals (1)
 Bob Bailey – backing vocals (2, 6, 8)
 Kim Fleming – backing vocals (2, 6, 8)
 Vicki Hampton – backing vocals (2, 6, 8)
 Jackson Browne – backing vocals (3)
 Stephanie Bentley – backing vocals (5)
 Emmylou Harris – backing vocals (7)
 Matraca Berg – backing vocals (9, 11)
 Gordon Kennedy – backing vocals (12)
 Wayne Kirkpatrick – backing vocals (12)

Production 
 Garth Fundis – producer 
 Trisha Yearwood – producer 
 Jeff Balding – recording 
 Chuck Ainlay – mixing
 Matt Andrews – recording assistant, additional recording 
 Dave Sinko – additional recording
 Mark Ralston – mix assistant 
 Denny Purcell — mastering
 Scott Paschall – production assistant 
 Virginia Team – art direction 
 Chris Ferrara – design
 Sonya Watson – design
 Andrew Southam — photography
 Sheri McCoy – stylist
 Maria Smoot – hair stylist
 Nancy Russell – management 

Studios
 Recorded at Sound Emporium (Nashville, Tennessee).
 Mixed at Sound Stage Studios (Nashville, Tennessee).
 Edited and Mastered at Georgetown Masters (Nashville, Tennessee).

Chart performance

Album

Singles

Certifications

References

MCA Records albums
Trisha Yearwood albums
2000 albums
Albums produced by Garth Fundis